On Weights and Measures is a historical, lexical, metrological, and geographical treatise compiled in 392 AD in Constantia by Epiphanius of Salamis (c. 315–403). The greater part of the work is devoted to a discussion on Greek and Roman weights and measures.

The composition was written at the request of a Persian priest, sent to Epiphanius by letter from the Roman emperor in Constantinople. Although five fragments of an early Greek version are known to exist, with one entitled Περὶ μέτρων καὶ στάθμων (On Weights and Measures), added by a later hand, this Syriac version is the only complete copy that has survived. Partial translations in Armenian and Georgian are also known to exist. Its modern title belies its content, as the work also contains important historical anecdotes about people and places not written about elsewhere.

Two manuscripts of On Weights and Measures, written in Syriac on parchment, are preserved at the British Museum in London. The older (Or. Add. 17148) was found in Egypt and, according to the colophon, was written in the Seleucid era, in "nine-hundred and sixty-[...]" (with the last digit effaced, meaning, that it was written between the years 649 AD–659 AD). The younger manuscript is designated "Or. Add. 14620".

The first to attempt a modern publication of Epiphanius' work was Paul de Lagarde in 1880, who reconstructed the original Syriac text by exchanging it with Hebrew characters, and who had earlier published excerpts from several of the Greek fragments treating on weights and measures in his Symmicta. In 1973, a critical edition of the Greek text was published by E.D. Moutsoulas in Theologia.

Synopsis
Part One
In folios [54b–55c], Hadrian's journey and arrival in the East is dated "47 years after the destruction of Jerusalem."
Translations
In folios [47a–49a]; [51d–52a]; [56d–57b] Epiphanius names four major translations of the Hebrew Bible, made in the Greek tongue: the LXX made by the seventy-two translators, another by Aquila of Pontus, one by Theodotion, and yet another by Symmachus. A fifth Greek translation was discovered in wine jars in Jericho, and a sixth in Nicopolis near Actium. Afterwards, Origen arranged six columns of the extant Greek translations and two of the Hebrew side by side, naming it the Hexapla. Epiphanius expands his description of the translation of the seventy-two translators (known as the Septuagint) and how they were assigned thirty-six cells, two to each cell, on the Pharian island. Two translators translated the Book of Genesis, another two the Book of Exodus, another two the Book of Leviticus, and so forth, until the entire 22 canonical books of the Hebrew Bible (today there are 24) had all been translated into the Greek tongue. The seventy-two translators were drawn from the twelve tribes of Israel, six men to each tribe who were skilled in the Greek language.
 
In folios [49a–50a] Epiphanius gives a description of the canonical books of the Hebrew Bible and translations made of the same. In his day, he notes that the Scroll of Ruth and the Book of Judges were joined together, and considered as one book. So, too, the Books of Ezra and Nehemiah were joined, and considered as one book, as were First and Second Chronicles (Paraleipomena) considered as one book, as were the First and Second Samuel (Book of First and Second Kingdoms) considered as one book, and the First and Second Kings (Book of Third and Fourth Kingdoms) considered as one book.

Part Two
Prominent figures
In spite of Epiphanius' interest in Jewish themes, his narrative often takes on a distorted and stereotypical view of Judaism. Still, he is an invaluable source on the lives of people and places that figure highly in Jewish lore. In folios [54a–55c]; [55c–55d] Epiphanius treats on the lives of two prominent persons who became proselytes to the Jewish religion; the one Aquila (known also as Onkelos) who was a relation of Hadrian, and whom he made the overseer of Jerusalem's rebuilding around 115 AD. The other person of interest who is described by him is Symmachus, also known as Sūmkos in rabbinic literature. Symmachus is mentioned as belonging originally to the Samaritan nation, and is said to have converted to Judaism during the reign of Verus. He subsequently underwent a second circumcision and became a disciple of Rabbi Meir. Symmachus belonged to the fifth generation (165–200 AD) of Rabbinical teachers referred to in the text of the Mishnah. The Emperor Hadrian is said to have passed through Palestine while en route to Egypt, some 47 years after the destruction of Jerusalem.
Part Three
Weights and Measures
Folios [61d–73b] contain a treatise on the known weights and measures used in his day among the Hebrews, the Greeks and the Romans. He states the equivalent weights for the kab (cab), kor, the lethekh (Lethek), homer, bath, modius (Hebrew: seah = lit. "measure"), and mina (Hebrew: maneh), among others. Epiphanius, explaining the sense of certain obscure passages in the original Aramaic New Testament, writes: "The talent is called Maneh (mina) among the Hebrews," the equivalent of 100 denarii. In folios [62b–62c] Epiphanius distinguishes between "a handful" in I Kings 17:12 and "a handful" in Exodus 9:8 and Leviticus 16:12; in the former case it refers to only one handful, but in latter cases it refers to "a measure of two handfuls."

Part Four
Geography of Palestine, Asia Minor and the Levant
In folios [73b–75a] Epiphanius gives the names of several cities and places of renown, both in his time and in ancient times, such as: Mount Ararat (§ 61), Aṭaṭ (§ 62), or what is known as the "threshing floor of the thorn bush", and whose description echoes that of Rashi's commentary on Genesis 50:10, Abarim (§ 63); Aviʿazar (§ 68), or what is Eḇen haʿezer of I Samuel 4:1, said to be "fourteen [Roman] miles distant east and north of Eleutheropolis, in a valley"; Carmel(§ 77); Carmel of the sea (§ 78); Akko (§ 76);  Anathoth (§ 66); Azekah (§ 64) - a city in whose time was called Ḥǝwarta; Bethel (§ 73); Ophrah (§ 67); Carthage (§ 79) - where the Canaanites had migrated from Phoenicia and who were called in his day Bizakanoi (scattered people); Rekem (§ 71), Jaffa (§ 75), Jerusalem(§ 74), et al.

Chronology of the Ptolemies
 Ptolemy (I), also called Soter (of the Rabbit [Lagos]) = reigned 40 years
 Ptolemy (II) Philadelphus = reigned 38 years
 Ptolemy (III) the Well-Doer (Euergetes) = 24 years
 Ptolemy (IV) Philopator = 21 years
 Ptolemy (V) Epiphanes = 22 years
 Ptolemy (VI) Philometor = 34 years
 Ptolemy (VIII) the Lover of Learning and the Well-Doer = 29 years
 Ptolemy the Savior (Soter) = 15 years
 Ptolemy (X) who is also Alexas = 12 years
 Ptolemy (IX) the brother of Alexas = 8 years
 Ptolemy (XII) Dionysius = 31 years
 Cleopatra, the daughter of Ptolemy = 32 years

Chronology of the Roman emperors
 Augustus = reigned 56 years, 6 months
 Tiberius = reigned 23 years
 Gaius = 3 years, 9 months, 29 days
 Claudius = 13 years, 1 month, 28 days
 Nero = 13 years, 7 months, 27 days
 Galba = 7 months, 26 days
 Otho = 3 months, 5 days
 Vitellius = reign: 8 months, 12 days
 Vespasian = reign: 9 years, 7 months, 12 days
 Titus = reign: 2 years, 2 months, 2 days
 Domitian = reign: 15 years, 5 months
 Nerva = reign: 1 year, 4 months
 Trajan = reign: 19 years
 Hadrian = reign: 21 years
 Antoninus, surnamed Pius = reign: 22 years
 Marcus Aurelius Antoninus ("otherwise known as Verus", also "called Commodus Lucius") = reign: 19 years. Of these years, 7 years he ruled jointly with Lucius Aurelius Commodus
 Commodus II = reign: 13 years
 Pertinax = 6 months
 Severus (reigned jointly with his son, Antoninus) = reign: 18 years
 Caracalla, also called Geta, who is also Antoninus = reign: 7 years (ruled jointly with Lucius Aurelius Commodus)
 Macrinus = 1 year
 Antoninus II = 4 years
 Alexander, the son of Mammaea = reign: 13 years
 Maximian = 3 years
 Gordian = 6 years
 Philip = 7 years
 Decius = 1 year, 3 months
 Gallienus (Gallus), who ruled jointly with Volusianus = 2 years, 4 months
 Valerian, who ruled jointly with Gallienus, also known as Gallus = 12 years
 Claudius = 1 year, 9 months
 Aurelian = 5 years, 6 months
 Tacitus = 6 months
 Probus = 6 years, 4 months
 Carus, who ruled jointly with his sons, Carinus and Numerian = 2 years
 Diocletian, who ruled jointly with  Maximian, Constantine and Maxentius = 20 years
 Maximian (Galerius), Licinius and Constantine, who ruled in succession one after the other = 32 years
 Constans, Constantine and Constantius, followed by Julian, Jovian, Valentinian the Great, Valens, Gratian the son of Valentinian, Valentinian the younger (son of Valentinian), Theodosius, Arcadius the son of Theodosius, Honorius the Illustrious, who was the son of Theodosius, as far as the time of Epiphanius, during the second consulship of Arcadius Augustus and Rufus [year 392] . Years collected altogether: 57 years.

The regnal years of the Caesars as stated by Epiphanius differ slightly in some places from the extant Greek sources. With respect to events in Rome after the reign of Pertinax, both Epiphanius and Jerome do not mention the ascension of Didius Julianus after the assassination of Pertinax, but write only that Severus succeeded him. This may have been because they did not consider his 9-week reign, which he obtained through usurpation, to be legitimate. Similarly, Epiphanius does not mention the ascension of Aemilian. It can be adduced from Jerome's Chronicon that Aemilian, who "caused a revolt in Moesia," was never officially confirmed by the Senate in Rome. Epiphanius' method of recording the regnal years from Augustus to Hadrian, with his pinpoint recollection of the number of months and days to each reign, can be said to be accurate, based on Josephus' own testimony about himself, saying that he was aged 56 in the 13th year of the reign of Caesar Domitian, and that he (Josephus) was born in the 1st year of Caesar Gaius. Using Epiphanius' chronology for the later empire, the years are collected as 56. By comparison, the span of years in Suetonius' De vita Caesarum (Lives of the Caesars), which gives 14 years for Claudius and 15 years for Nero, the same time frame would span a period of some 58 years.

See also
 Chronograph of 354, which contains a similar list of rulers
 List of Roman emperors
 Canon of Kings

Notes

References

Bibliography

Further reading
 Renan Baker, "Epiphanius, 'On Weights and Measures' §14: Hadrian's Journey to the East and the Rebuilding of Jerusalem", pub. in: Zeitschrift für Papyrologie und Epigraphik, vol. 182 (2012), pp. 157–167

4th-century books
Texts in Syriac
4th-century history books
Works by Epiphanius of Salamis
Holy Land during Byzantine rule
Greek chronicles
Textual scholarship
History of the Levant
Obsolete units of measurement
Units of volume
Systems of units
Human-based units of measurement
Christian apologetic works
Treatises
King lists